Civic Platform (PO) is a political party in Poland. It is currently led by Donald Tusk.

It was formed in 2001 by splinter factions from the Solidarity Electoral Action and Freedom Union, and it later placed second in the 2001 parliamentary election. It served in the parliamentary opposition until 2007, when it overtook Law and Justice, won 209 seats and Tusk was elected as prime minister. Following the Smolensk air disaster in 2010, Bronisław Komorowski served as acting president and was elected as president in the same year. Tusk continued to serve as prime minister and leader of Civic Platform until he resigned in 2014 to assume the post of the president of the European Council. The party was afterwards defeated in the 2015 parliamentary and presidential elections. It also placed second in the 2019 parliamentary election, and its 2020 presidential candidate, Rafał Trzaskowski, won 49% of the popular vote in the second round and lost the election to Andrzej Duda.

Initially positioned as a Christian democratic party with strong economically liberal tendencies, it soon adopted liberal conservatism throughout the 2000s, although during their time in power they were aligned with more pragmatic and centrist views, and were characterized as a catch-all party. In the 2010s, the Civic Platform adopted more socially liberal policies, aligned itself with conservative liberalism, and it has been since positioned in the centre and leaning towards the centre-right. It also strongly advocates Poland's membership in the European Union and NATO. It is a member of the European People's Party.

It currently holds 106 seats in the Sejm and 37 seats in the Senate of Poland, and it also heads the Civic Coalition, which was founded in 2018. Since its creation, it has shown strong electoral performances in Warsaw, the west, and the north of Poland. Since the 2000s, the Civic Platform has established itself as one of the dominant political parties in Poland.

History
The Civic Platform was founded in 2001 as economically liberal, Christian-democratic split from existing parties. Founders Andrzej Olechowski, Maciej Płażyński, and Donald Tusk were sometimes jokingly called "the Three Tenors" by Polish media and commentators. Olechowski and Płażyński left the party during the 2001–2005 parliamentary term, leaving Tusk as the sole remaining founder, and current party leader.

In the 2001 general election the party secured 12.6% of the vote and 65 deputies in the Sejm, making it the largest opposition party to the government led by the Democratic Left Alliance (SLD).

In the 2002 local elections PO stood together with Law and Justice in 15 voivodeships (in 14 as POPiS, in Podkarpacie with another centre-right political parties). They stood separately only in Mazovia.

In 2005, PO led all opinion polls with 26% to 30% of public support. However, in the 2005 general election, in which it was led by Jan Rokita, PO polled only 24.1% and unexpectedly came second to the 27% garnered by Law and Justice (PiS). A centre-right coalition of PO and PiS (nicknamed:PO-PiS) was deemed most likely to form a government after the election. Yet the putative coalition parties had a falling out in the wake of the fiercely contested Polish presidential election of 2005.

Lech Kaczyński (PiS) won the second round of the presidential election on 23 October 2005 with 54% of the vote, ahead of Tusk, the PO candidate. Due to the demands of PiS for control of all the armed ministries (the Defence Ministry, the Ministry of the Interior and the Ministry of Foreign Affairs) and the office of the Prime Minister, PO and PiS were unable to form a coalition. Instead, PiS formed a coalition government with the support of the League of Polish Families (LPR) and Self-Defense of the Republic of Poland (SRP). PO became the opposition to this PiS-led coalition government.

The PiS-led coalition fell apart in 2007 amid a corruption scandal involving Andrzej Lepper and Tomasz Lipiec and internal leadership disputes. These events led to new elections, and in the 21 October 2007 parliamentary election PO won 41.51% of the popular vote and 209 out of 460 seats in the Sejm and 60 out of 100 seats in the Senate of Poland. Civic Platform, now the largest party in both houses of parliament, subsequently formed a coalition with the Polish People's Party (PSL).

At the 2010 Polish presidential election, following the Smolensk air disaster which killed the incumbent Polish president Lech Kaczyński, Tusk decided not to present his candidature, considered an easy possible victory over PiS leader Jarosław Kaczyński. During the PO primary elections, Bronisław Komorowski defeated the Oxford-educated, PiS defector Foreign Minister Radosław Sikorski. At the polls, Komorowski defeated Jarosław Kaczyński, ensuring PO dominance over the current Polish political landscape.

In November 2010, local elections granted Civic Platform about 30.1 percent of the votes and PiS at 23.2 percent, an increase for the former and a drop for the latter compared to the 2006 elections.

PO succeeded in winning four consecutive elections (a record in post-communist Poland), and Tusk remains as kingmaker. PO's dominance is also a reflection of left-wing weakness and divisions on both sides of the political scene, with PiS suffering a splinter in Autumn 2010.

Civic Platform won the plurality of votes in the 9 October 2011 parliamentary election, gaining 39.18% of the popular vote, 207 of 460 seats in the Sejm, and 63 out of 100 seats in the Senate.

In the 2014 European elections, Civic Platform came first place nationally, achieving 32.13% of the vote and returning 19 MEPs.

In the 2014 local elections, PO achieved 179 seats, the highest single number.

In the 2015 presidential election, PO endorsed Bronisław Komorowski, a former member of PO from 2001 till 2010. He lost the election receiving 48.5% of the popular vote, while Andrzej Duda won with 51.5%.

In the 2015 parliamentary election, PO came second place after PiS, achieving 24.09% of the popular vote, 138 out of 460 seats in the Sejm, 34 out of 100 seats in the Senate.

In the 2018 local elections, PO achieved 26.97% of the votes, coming second after PiS.

In the 2019 European elections, PO participated in the European Coalition electoral alliance which achieved 38.47%, coming second after PiS.

Ideology
The Civic Platform has been mainly described as a centrist or centre-right political party. Due to the peculiarity of Polish politics as a major liberal opponent of the conservative PiS, the party is also classified as centre-left. It has been also described as liberal-conservative, conservative, conservative-liberal, Christian democratic, classical liberal, neoliberal, liberal, and social-liberal. It was also described as pragmatic and big tent. It supports Poland's membership in the European Union.

Since 2007, when Civic Platform formed the government, the party has gradually moved from its Christian-democratic stances, and many of its politicians hold more liberal positions on social issues. In 2013, the Civic Platform's government introduced public funding of in vitro fertilisation program. Civic Platform also supports civil unions for same-sex couples but is against same-sex marriage and the adoption of children by same-sex couples. The party also currently supports liberalisation of the abortion law, which it had opposed while in government.

Despite declaring in the parliamentary election campaign the will to limit taxation in Poland, the Civic Platform has in fact increased it. The party refrained from implementing the flat tax, increasing instead the value-added tax from 22% to 23% in 2011. It has also increased the excise imposed on diesel oil, alcoholic beverages, tobacco and oil. The party has eliminated many tax exemptions.

In response to the climate crisis, the Civic Platform has promised to end the use of coal for energy in Poland by 2040.

After becoming the biggest opposition party, the Civic Platform became more socially liberal. This tendency is especially popular among the younger generation of the party's politicians such as Mayor of Warsaw and candidate in the presidential election Rafał Trzaskowski. The party has also changed its opinion about the social programmes of PiS and PSL, starting to support them.

Political support

Today, Civic Platform enjoys support amongst higher class constituencies. Professionals, academics, managers and businessmen vote for the party in large numbers. People with university degrees support the party more than less educated voters. PO voters tend to be those people who generally benefited from European integration and economic liberalisation since 1989 and are satisfied with their life standard. Many PO voters are social liberals who value environmentalism, secularism and Europeanisation. Young people are another voting bloc that support the party, though some of them withdrew support after their economic and social situation did not improve significantly when PO was in government. Conservatives used to vote for the party before PO moved sharply to the left on economic (e.g., increase of taxes) and social issues (e.g., support for civil unions).

Areas that are more likely to vote for PO are in the west and north of the country, especially parts of the former Prussia before 1918. Many of these people previously used to vote for the Democratic Left Alliance when that party enjoyed support and influence. Large cities in the whole country prefer the party, rather than rural areas and smaller towns. This is caused by the diversity, secularism and social liberalism urban voters tend to value. In urban areas, conservative principles are much less identified with by voters. Large cities in Poland have a better economic climate, which draws support to PO.

Leadership

Election results

Sejm

Senate

Presidential

Regional assemblies

European Parliament

Voivodeship Marshals

Notable politicians

See also
 List of Civic Platform politicians
 Politics of Poland
 List of political parties in Poland
 Liberalism in Poland

Notes

References

Sources
Adam Zakowski, A leading force, Polityka, March 2009

External links
 

 
Centrist parties in Poland
Conservative liberal parties
Conservative parties in Poland
Christian democratic parties in Europe
Liberal conservative parties in Poland
Liberal parties in Poland
Political parties in Poland